Colin Stewart (born November 1, 1974) is a record producer and audio engineer from Victoria, British Columbia, who has been active recording bands since 1996. His professionalism and his passion for recording made others to call him as one of "Vancouver's top indie-rock engineers".

He owns and operates a studio in Victoria, British Columbia called The Hive Creative Labs, which has established itself as a musical institution of Canada's west coast independent music scene, having hosted and recorded "Black Mountain, Destroyer, Ladyhawk, Frog Eyes, Hot Hot Heat and P:ano, along with virtually every other significant West coast indie act". Colin has also recorded albums by Kathryn Calder, Sleepy Sun band, Yukon Blonde, The Cave Singers, Veda Hille, No Kids, Dan Mangan, Pretty Girls Make Graves and many others.

He is also a founding member of the band Gigi. On 30 September 2013 the recording studio Hive Creative Labs which was a home for a lot of Vancouver acts closed its doors because of Producer Colin Stewart's relocation to Victoria.

He is married to singer-songwriter Kathryn Calder.

Selected discography

References

External links
 Colin Stewart Recording
 The Hive Creative Labs
 Colin Stewart on AllMusic.com

1974 births
Living people
Canadian record producers
People from Victoria, British Columbia